Jeffrey Lingan Pasley (born February 27, 1964) is a professor of American history at the University of Missouri, specializing in the Early Republic.

He is the oldest son of John Pasley, a former civil engineer and local public official.

Early life and education 
Pasley spent most of his childhood in Topeka, Kansas, graduating from Washburn Rural High School in 1982. He graduated from Carleton College, a liberal-arts school in Northfield, Minnesota, in 1986. After graduating, he moved to Washington, D.C., where he worked on the staff of Al Gore's attempted campaign for the Democratic presidential nomination in the 1988 election, during much of 1986 and 1987. Throughout the same period, he also contributed articles for The New Republic, a liberal political commentary magazine.

Academic career 
Pasley completed graduate school at Harvard University in 1993 with a Ph.D. He taught at Florida State University from 1993 to 1999 before beginning his current tenure at the University of Missouri later in 1999.  Pasley's research focuses on American political culture between the American Revolution and the Civil War. In addition, Pasley has taught classes on the United States during the Cold War, especially in the field of popular conspiracy theories.

His 2001 book The Tyranny of Printers showed that many early professional politicians in the U.S. were newspaper printers and editors, based upon "well-crafted biographical accounts of critical figures". A later work, The First Presidential Contest (2013) was described as "A superb, important book. Likely to become the definitive study of the 1796 election." "The importance of this book" lay in setting the election in the wider political context of the time.

In a 2015 interview with Vox Magazine (an arm of the Columbia Missourian newspaper), Pasley talked about the role of comic books in reflecting the social political climate of the time in postwar America.

Bibliography 
"The Tyranny of Printers": Newspaper Politics in the Early American Republic (University of Virginia Press, 2001)
Beyond the Founders: New Approaches to the Political History of the Early American Republic, co-authored with David Waldstreicher and Andrew Robertson (University of North Carolina Press, 2004)
The First Presidential Contest: The Election of 1796 and the Founding of American Democracy (University of Kansas Press, 2013)

References

External links 
 Jeffrey L. Pasley

1964 births
Living people
University of Missouri faculty

Harvard Graduate School of Arts and Sciences alumni
People from Topeka, Kansas
Carleton College alumni
The New Republic people
Florida State University faculty
Historians of the United States